Sialiec is an agrotown in the Biaroza rayon of the Brest Voblast of Belarus.

Famous inhabitants
 Alexandre Okinczyc, a physician
 ancestors of Vladimir Vysotsky, the Soviet singer
Elijah ben Solomon Zalman (1720–97), Talmudic scholar known as the Vilna Gaon

References

External links
 Seltz Business List 1930
 An old map 
 A new map 

Populated places in Brest Region
Agrotowns in Belarus
Brest Litovsk Voivodeship
Pruzhansky Uyezd
Polesie Voivodeship